Thrige can refer to several things:

 Thomas B. Thrige (1866–1938), Danish entrepreneur, industrialist and businessman
 Thomas B. Thrige Street, a major street in the center of Odense, Denmark
 T-T Electric, one of Europe's leading manufacturers of d.c. motors
 Thrige Electric, from August 1, 2005, known as T-T Electric.
 Thrige-Titan, see T-T Electric
 Thrige-Scott Ltd
 Thomas B. Thrige Center for Microinstruments
 Thrige, a Danish automobile brand